Mil Sefid (also Romanized as Mīl Sefīd and Mīl-e Sefīd; also known as Mazra‘eh Mīl-e Sefīd) is a village in Kezab Rural District, Khezrabad District, Saduq County, Yazd Province, Iran. At the 2006 census, its population was 95, in 26 families.

References 

Populated places in Saduq County